Emmanuel Ngara is a Zimbabwean academic and Pro-Vice-Chancellor of the University of KwaZulu-Natal, South Africa. He has also served as Pro-Vice-Chancellor of the University of Fort Hare, South Africa, and the University of Zimbabwe.

Essays 
 Revolutionary Practice and Style in Lusophone Liberation Poetry (1990) - Found in Tejumola Olaniyan and Ato Quayson's African Literature: An Anthology of Criticism and Theory

References

Academic staff of the University of Zimbabwe
Academic staff of the University of KwaZulu-Natal
Living people
Year of birth missing (living people)
Academic staff of the University of Fort Hare